Gignac may refer to:

Places
 Gignac, Hérault
 Gignac, Lot
 Gignac, Vaucluse
 Gignac-la-Nerthe, in the Bouches-du-Rhône département

People
 André-Pierre Gignac, French football striker playing for Tigres
 Anthony Gignac, incarcerated Columbian-American con-artist and fraudster
 Clément Gignac, Canadian politician in the province of Quebec
 Fernand Gignac (1934-2006), French Canadian singer and actor
 Gilles Gignac, Australian psychologist
 Marie Gignac, Canadian actress